Pristina is a genus of annelids belonging to the family Naididae.

Species:

Pristina acuminata 
Pristina aequiseta 
Pristina americana 
Pristina bilobata

References

Annelids